The Maryland Reapers were an American Indoor Football team that played in 2012.  Based in Laurel, Maryland, the Reapers played their home games at The Gardens Ice House.

Season-by-season

|-
|2012 || 1 || 5 || 0 || -- || 
|-

2012 Season

References

External links
 
 

American football teams established in 2011
American football teams disestablished in 2012
Defunct American football teams in Maryland
Former American Indoor Football teams
Laurel, Maryland
2011 establishments in Maryland
2012 disestablishments in Maryland